James Gettis (May 4, 1816 – December 14, 1867) was a lawyer and judge in Tampa, Florida.  He was the second lawyer in Tampa. Gettis was also a city councilman, and state representative, and the first town clerk.

Originally from Pennsylvania, Gettis came to Tampa in 1848.  He promoted development of Tampa and sought to bring rail service to the area.

An ardent Confederate secessionist during the Civil War, he attended Florida's Secession Convention and signed the Ordinance of Secession, and was the hero of the Battle of Tampa.

Lawyer and judge
He was the second lawyer admitted to the bar in Tampa, on October 24, 1848, and tutored other law students, including John A. Henderson and Henry L. Mitchell. James McKay Sr. was one of his clients. His law office was on Franklin Street.

In 1865, Gettis was appointed Circuit and Probate judge.

Civil War
Though he held no slaves, Gettis was a pro-slavery secessionist,  and was one of two delegates form Hillsborough County to vote for secession when the Convention met in January 1861.

He served in the Confederate Army during the Civil War for a brief period, as captain of the 7th Florida Infantry, Company B, the "South Florida Rifles". Gettis was singled out for his bravery by captain John William Pearson during the Battle of Tampa. He received a medical discharge and returned to Tampa due to ill health, inflicted with "incipient phthisis and chronic diarrhea". Just before his discharge, he organized the Tampa City Guards.

Personal

He was a Master Mason and American Party member. He had no children, but raised the brothers of W. B. Henderson after the death of Henderson's father. In his will, Gettis left all his property to James F. Henderson. He is buried in Oaklawn Cemetery in downtown Tampa.

References

19th-century American politicians
1816 births
1867 deaths
Politicians from Tampa, Florida
Confederate States Army personnel
19th-century American lawyers
People of Florida in the American Civil War
People from Pennsylvania